Anny Schilder (14.02.1959) is a Dutch pop singer, and was the lead singer of BZN from 1976 to 1984.

Biography

BZN-Singer
Jack Veerman, the drummer of BZN met Schilder when she was working as a salesgirl at an eel-stand in Volendam, and when his band was looking for a female singer, he remembered she had a great voice. They had her audition, but she initially was too timid to become a performer. It took some time, but Veerman was able to convince her. She became, together with Jan Keizer the face of BZN from 1976 until 1984. The first single the band released with the two lead-singers was Mon Amour, which was an immediate success. A long string of top-10 hits followed.

In 1984 Schilder decided to leave BZN, citing that she needed more time to spend with her family. Later on she admitted that the continuous touring and performing was getting too much for her. She had her sister babysit her daughter, who started calling her Mama instead of Schilder. Carola Smit replaced her as lead-singer of BZN.

Solo
After leaving BZN, Schilder had a reasonably successful solo career, although never as successful as with BZN. She released her first solo single in December 1984 for the holidays called Eeuwige Kerst (Eternal Christmas). The song was written by Henk Temming of Het Goede Doel, and accompanied by the children's choir of Kinderen voor Kinderen, as well as the Amsterdam Choir De Stem Des Volks.

She did release several other hits, like Love is...(1985), Adieu Cherie (1988) and You are my Hero (1989), which entered the charts in the top 10. Her most successful album was You are my Hero, which just fell short of obtaining a gold-record.

Ending Her Solo-Career
After 1997 Schilder stopped recording new music. She met a Spanish Discotheque Owner, and in 2004 she left Volendam to move to Spain with her children. She did not return to The Netherlands until 2006, after which she re-energized her singing career.

BNZ'66-Singer
The only singing engagements Schilder did between 2000 and 2006 was with a BZN-reunion band, made up of former BZN members, called BZN'66. This band played mostly songs from the early years of BZN, during which period beat and rock music were their genre.

Book
On 21 March 2007 Schilder released her autobiography Anny en Ik (Anny and I). In this book she describes her divorce in 1986 and her postpartum depression. The book sold 10,000 copies in the first three months after its release. At the same time she released a new album with the same title. The CD contains covers of BZN songs, as well as covers of other artist's hits, like The Way Old Friends Do from ABBA. This song is a duet with Schilder's daughter Anja. The song Rockin' the Trolls, a BZN-cover, was released as a single, which includes vocals by former-BZN member Jan Veerman.

Number 1 hit in South Africa
In 2007 Schilder released a song titled First Kiss Goodnight, a duet with South-African singer Gerrie Pretorius. The song reached the number 1 spot in the charts in South Africa, and received platinum status. The song was released in September 2007 in The Netherlands, but did not chart.

Anny & José
In May 2009 Schilder released a new single titled Be My Baby, which was a duet with Luv' singer José Hoebee. The song was somewhat successful in Belgium, and Schilder and Hoebee continued to appear together on occasion.

Jan & Anny
25 years after leaving BZN, Schilder performed for the first time with co-singer Jan Keizer. They sang Mon Amour at the 80th birthday celebration of famous TV host Mies Bouwman. This was broadcast by the AVRO TV station on 30 December 2009.

The reaction to their performance was so positive, they decided to continue working together. Their management revealed they would record an album and a single, as well as a TV music special. On 2 July 2010 they released the single Take me to Ibiza as Jan en Anny. The song reached number 3 in the charts, making it the most successful song released by BZN-related artists in 10 years. The album Together Again was released on 10 September 2010, and Mies Bouwman presented the duo with the first copy during her show. During the same show, a few minutes later, they received a Golden Record. The second song released as a single was C'est La Vie, which reached the top 5 of the Single Top 100. The third song released as a single was Amor Amor Amor. On 28 October 2012 they performed at the Sala Palatului in Bucharest for 7,000 fans, as a start to their theater tour through The Netherlands. On 24 September 2018 they announced they would stop performing as a duo, and in the end of 2019 a farewell concert was broadcast on TV.

Discography

Albums 

|-
|align="left"|Here I am||1985||20-04-1985||21||9||
|-
|align="left"|Anny Schilder||11-1988||03-12-1988||30||14||
|-
|align="left"|You are my hero||11-1989||09-12-1989||34||11||
|-
|align="left"|All of me||12-1990||-||||||
|-
|align="left"|The best of Anny Schilder||1991||-|||||| Greatest Hits
|-
|align="left"|This is Anny Schilder||12-1991||04-01-1992||65||5||
|-
|align="left"|Spiegel||10-1993||06-11-1993||63||6||
|-
|align="left"|High noon||03-1995||01-04-1995||38||12||
|-
|align="left"|Sentimientos||07-1997||-||||||
|-
|align="left"|Anny en ik||03-2007||21-03-2007||90||2||
|-
|align="left"|Together again||10-09-2010||18-09-2010||5||17|| with Jan Keizer / Gold
|-
|align="left"|The Two of us||14-02-2013||23-02-2013||11||1*||| with Jan Keizer
|-
|align="left"|Unforgettable Duets||10-10-2014||||||||| with Jan Keizer
|-
|align="left"|Greatest hits||10-11-2017||||||||| with Jan Keizer (CD & DVD)
|-
|align="left"|Grande Finale ||18-10-2019||||||||| with Jan Keizer (CD & DVD)
|}

Singles 

|-
|align="left"|Eeuwige kerst||1984||15-12-1984||12||5|| with Het Goede Doel, Kinderen voor Kinderen en De Stem des Volks / #5 in the Single Top 100
|-
|align="left"|Love is...||1985||23-02-1985||28||4|| #20 in the Single Top 100
|-
|align="left"|Hold on||1985||-||||||
|-
|align="left"|Mama's dinky darling||1985||31-08-1985||tip10||-|| #48 in the Single Top 100
|-
|align="left"|Mandola mandoline||1986||22-03-1986||tip16||-||
|-
|align="left"|Think about love||1986||-||||||
|-
|align="left"|Valley of pain||1987||-||||||
|-
|align="left"|Darling||1987||-||||||
|-
|align="left"|Adieu cherie||1988||05-11-1988||19||5|| #15 in the Single Top 100
|-
|align="left"|Happy Xmas (War is over) / Gelukkig kerstfeest||1988||10-12-1988||35||3|| Artiesten voor het Ronald McDonaldhuis / #15 in the Single Top 100
|-
|align="left"|Goodbye farewell||1989||14-01-1989||tip11||-|| #46 in the Single Top 100
|-
|align="left"|La bambola||1989||-||||||
|-
|align="left"|You are my hero||1989||28-10-1989||9||7|| #7 in the Single Top 100 / Alarmschijf
|-
|align="left"|Le soleil||1990||13-01-1990||tip12||-|| #47 in the Single Top 100
|-
|align="left"|Sailorboy||1990||-||||||
|-
|align="left"|De eerste keer||1990||08-09-1990||tip8||-|| with Dave / #40 in de Single Top 100
|-
|align="left"|Where would I be without you||1990||-||||||
|-
|align="left"|I take it back||1990||-||||||
|-
|align="left"|Samen leven||12-1990||-|||||| Artiesten voor Droezbal / #62 in the Single Top 100
|-
|align="left"|Love is all I wanna give||1991||21-12-1991||tip11||-|| #42 in the Single Top 100
|-
|align="left"|Gladly belong to you||1991||-||||||
|-
|align="left"|Working girl||1992||25-04-1992||tip3||-|| #42 in the Single Top 100
|-
|align="left"|If you go||1992||-||||||
|-
|align="left"|When you walk in the room||1993||24-07-1993||tip4||-|| with Piet Veerman / #32 in the Single Top 100
|-
|align="left"|Er is één ding dat altijd blijft||1993||09-10-1993||tip8||-|| #38 in the Single Top 100
|-
|align="left"|Moeder||1993||-||||||
|-
|align="left"|Meisje van 16||1993||-||||||
|-
|align="left"|High noon||1995||-||||||
|-
|align="left"|Sweet Suzanne||1995||-||||||
|-
|align="left"|Mon amour||05-1995||-|||||| with Demis Roussos
|-
|align="left"|Yo te quiero mi amor||1996||-||||||
|-
|align="left"|A perfect day||11-1996||-|||||| with Roger Whittaker
|-
|align="left"|Junto a mi||1997||-||||||
|-
|align="left"|Yours/Quiereme Mucho||1997||-||||||
|-
|align="left"|Por Un Amor||1997||-||||||
|-
|align="left"|Toen kwam jij||14-10-2006||-|||||| with John de Bever / #80 in the Single Top 100
|-
|align="left"|Rockin' the trolls||04-2007||-|||||| with Jan Veerman
|-
|align="left"|The first kiss goodnight||09-2007||-|||||| with Gerrie Pretorius
|-
|align="left"|Be my baby||18-05-2009||-|||||| with José Hoebee as Anny & José / #92 in the Single Top 100
|-
|align="left"|Take me to Ibiza...||02-07-2010||-|||||| with Jan Keizer / #3 in the Single Top 100
|-
|align="left"|C'est la vie||27-11-2010||-|||||| with Jan Keizer
|-
|align="left"|Amor amor||06-05-2011||*||*||*|| with Jan Keizer
|-
|align="left"|Afraid to fall in love again||11-01-2013||*||*||*|| with Jan Keizer
|-
|align="left"|Felicita||12-09-2014|||||||| with Jan Keizer
|-
|align="left"|I love the summertime||26-06-2015|||||||| with Jan Keizer
|-
|align="left"|Mon amour je t'aime||12-11-2016|||||||| with Jan Keizer
|-
|align="left"|Don't try to change me||17-06-2017||||||||| with Jan Keizer
|-
|align="left"|Chanson d'amour||10-11-2017||-|||||| with Jan Keizer
|-
|align="left"|The time of my life||2019||-|||||| with Jan Keizer
|}

References

1959 births
Place of birth missing (living people)
Living people
Dutch pop singers
20th-century Dutch women singers